RBG-Azimuth (GDC-Azimuth') was a quarterly Ukrainian bilingual (Russophone and Ukrainophone) science fiction magazine, published since 2006. Its stories were written in the Russian language by authors living around the world. This included authors from Ukraine, Russia, Belarus, Lithuania, the United States, and others. The magazine name is an abbreviation that means “guidelines for damage control” in Russian “Руководство по Борьбе за Живучесть" (РБЖ).

RBG-Azimuth exclusively published one type of material - short stories. Each issue contained 10-13 stories. It claimed to revive traditions of the classic science fiction of the 1970-1980s (like Isaac Asimov, Clifford Simak, Robert Sheckley, Boris and Arkady Strugatsky). Its aim was to publish stories that help people live a better life.  Since 2010 RBG-Azimuth and Hanna Concern Publishing issued books with set of the best sci-fi stories of the year.

The magazine was nominated on Eurocon from Ukraine as the Best Magazine in 2010 and 2011 years. One of the authors is Nika Rakitina, who had received the ESFS encouragement award (Belarus) in Eurocon-2008.

Editors
 P. Amnuel, PhD (Israel)
 Y. Gavrilenko, PhD (Russia), general editor
 S. Zhilevich  (Belarus)
 V. Yatsenko (Ukraine), president
 I. Shlosberg (USA)

References

External links
Official website

2006 establishments in Ukraine
Magazines established in 2006
Science fiction magazines established in the 2000s
Quarterly magazines published in Russia
Literary magazines published in Russia
Science fiction magazines published in Russia
Russian-language magazines
Magazines published in Ukraine